The Silver Dart (or Aerodrome #4) was a derivative of an early aircraft built by a Canadian/U.S. team, which after many successful flights in Hammondsport, New York, earlier in 1908, was dismantled and shipped to Baddeck, Nova Scotia. It was flown from the ice of Baddeck Bay, a sub-basin of Bras d'Or Lake, on 23 February 1909, making it the first controlled powered flight in Canada. The aircraft was piloted by one of its designers, Douglas McCurdy. The original Silver Dart was designed and built by the Aerial Experiment Association (AEA), formed under the guidance of Dr. Alexander Graham Bell.

From 1891, Bell had begun experiments at Baddeck and Hammondsport to develop motor-powered heavier-than-air aircraft. By 1908, the success of the AEA was seen in a series of ground-breaking designs, culminating in the Silver Dart.  By the time the Silver Dart was constructed in late 1908, it was the Aerial Experiment Association's fourth flying machine. One of its precursors, the June Bug, had already broken records. It won the Scientific American Trophy for making the first official one mile (1609 m) flight in North America.

The frame and structure of the Silver Dart were made of steel tube, bamboo, friction tape, wire and wood. The wings were covered with rubberized, silvery balloon cloth provided by Capt. Thomas Scott Baldwin of Hammondsport; hence the name the "Silver Dart". Its Kirkham engine, supplied by Glenn Curtiss, was a reliable V-8 that developed  at 1,000  RPM.  The propeller was carved from a solid block of wood. The aircraft had what is now called a canard or an "elevator in front" design. Like most aircraft of its day the Silver Dart had poor control characteristics; likewise, it had no brakes.

Operational history
The aircraft was the first powered, heavier-than-air machine to fly in Canada. The first passenger flight in Canada was made in the Silver Dart on 2 August 1909.

The Canadian Army was unimpressed at the headway made by the group. The general impression of the time was that aircraft would never amount to much in actual warfare. Despite official scepticism, the Association was finally invited to the military base at Camp Petawawa to demonstrate the aircraft. The Silver Dart had great difficulty taking off. On its fifth flight on 2 August 1909, McCurdy wrecked the craft when one wheel struck a rise in the ground while landing. The Silver Dart never flew again.

Although a significant aircraft in Canada, the location of the initial design and construction of the Silver Dart made it an American design. Following the disbanding of the AEA, founding members, McCurdy and F.W. ("Casey") Baldwin obtained the Canadian patent rights for Aerodrome No. 4 (The Silver Dart), for the express purpose of producing a Canadian-made version. Subsequently, the Baddeck No. 1 and Baddeck No. 2 were built by the Canadian Aerodrome Company, the newly formed company that Baldwin and McCurdy established in 1909.

Tributes

50th Anniversary flight
There is a reconstruction of the Silver Dart on display at the Canada Aviation and Space Museum in Ottawa.  The reconstruction was built by volunteers from the Royal Canadian Air Force between 1956 and 1958 to celebrate the 50th anniversary of the first flight.  The aircraft flew over Baddeck Bay on the day of the anniversary but crashed due to high winds. A number of other scaled and full-scale replicas are found in Canadian and museum collections in other parts of the world, including examples at the Canadian Bushplane Heritage Centre in Sault Ste. Marie, the Atlantic Canada Aviation Museum, Reynolds-Alberta Museum, Canadian Warplane Heritage Museum A.G.Bell Museum, Baddeck Nova Scotia, the National Air Force Museum of Canada and Aero Space Museum of Calgary.

2009 Centennial celebrations

A small group of volunteers from the not-for-profit Aerial Experiment Association 2005 Inc. completed building a flying replica of the Silver Dart in early 2009.
 The main goal of the group was to recreate the original flight on 23 February 2009 – again on the frozen surface of Baddeck Bay near Baddeck, Nova Scotia. However, due to weather conditions forecast for the 23rd, the centennial flight and fly-by occurred on 22 February.  After a temporary repair made to the front wheel, former Canadian astronaut Bjarni Tryggvason piloted five successful flights that day. The replica is officially considered a Canadian heritage project, and throughout the year was the centerpiece of a series of events celebrating the centennial of the Silver Dart's first flight in Canada. In 2013, it was moved to the Alexander Graham Bell Museum in Baddeck, where it will be on permanent display.

Numerous other activities took place in 2009 to celebrate the Centennial of Flight, including a new exhibition entitled "Canadian Wings – A Remarkable Century of Flight" at the Canada Aviation Museum in Ottawa and a trans-Canada flight of vintage aircraft. The no longer functional official Nova Scotia Ministry of Tourism website Centennial Celebration of the Flight of the Silver Dart in Baddeck  promoted the flight and anniversary activities in Baddeck throughout the centennial. Various historical photos and documents were posted on that site, in a virtual museum presentation.

Commemorations
The 824 Silver Dart Squadron of the Royal Canadian Air Cadets in St. Peter's, Nova Scotia is named in honour of the Silver Dart. Another cadet squadron, the 602 McCurdy Squadron of the Royal Canadian Air Cadets – in Florence, Nova Scotia – is named in honour of John McCurdy, the original pilot of the Silver Dart.

Physical commemorations include Silver Dart Drive, located in Mississauga, Ontario, which is a perimeter roadway within the confines of Toronto Pearson International Airport. Another Ontario commemorative site is the double ice-surface arena in CFB Petawawa, known as the Silver Dart Arena.

On the 50th anniversary of its first flight, Canada Post issued a Canadian Silver Dart stamp on 23 February 1959. During the Canadian Centenary of Flight, Canada Post honoured the Silver Dart – and the first flight in Canada – with a Canadian postage stamp released on 23 February 2009.

Specifications (Silver Dart)

References

Notes

Citations

Bibliography

 Green, H. Gordon. The Silver Dart: The Authentic Story of the Hon. J.A.D. McCurdy, Canada's First Pilot. Fredericton, New Brunswick: Atlantic Advocate Book, 1959.
 Harding, Les. McCurdy and the Silver Dart. Sydney, Nova Scotia: University College of Cape Breton, 1998. .
 Milberry, Larry. Aviation in Canada: The Pioneer Decades, Vol. 1. Toronto: CANAV Books, 2008. .
 Molson, Ken M. and Harold A. Taylor. Canadian Aircraft Since 1909. Stittsville, Ontario: Canada's Wings, Inc., 1982. .
 Phillips, Allan. Into the 20th Century: 1900/1910 (Canada's Illustrated Heritage). Toronto: Natural Science of Canada Limited, 1977. .

External links

 The Silver Dart – Aerodrome 4.
  Silver Dart Replica Flies Into History Books.
 Audio recording of a CBC Interview with pilot John McCurdy about the first flight
 Silver Dart Drive at Pearson International Airport in Toronto

Biplanes
Canard aircraft
Silver Dart
1900s Canadian experimental aircraft
1900s United States experimental aircraft
Victoria County, Nova Scotia
Alexander Graham Bell
Single-engined pusher aircraft
Aircraft first flown in 1909